The 2018 Big 12 Conference women's soccer tournament was the postseason women's soccer tournament for the Big 12 Conference held from October 28– November 4, 2018. The seven-match tournament took place at the Swope Soccer Village in Kansas City, Missouri. The eight-team single-elimination tournament consisted of three rounds based on seeding from regular season conference play. The Baylor Bears were the defending champions and earned the top seed in 2018, facing eight seeded Iowa State in the first round (Iowa State won tiebreaker over Oklahoma State via head-to-head record). However, Baylor was not able to defend its crown, losing to West Virginia in the final.

Regular season standings
Source:

Bracket

Schedule

Quarterfinals

Semifinals

Final

Statistics

Goalscorers

Awards

Most valuable player
Source:
Offensive MVP – Sh'Nia Gordon – West Virginia
Defensive MVP – Easther Mayi Kith – West Virginia

All-Tournament team

References

External links
2018 Big 12 Soccer Championships

2018 Big 12 Conference women's soccer season
Big 12 Conference Women's Soccer Tournament